Paul Frederic Bowles (December 30, 1910November 18, 1999) was an American expatriate composer, author, and translator. He became associated with the Moroccan city of Tangier, where he settled in 1947 and lived for 52 years to the end of his life.

Following a cultured middle-class upbringing in New York City, during which he displayed a talent for music and writing, Bowles pursued his education at the University of Virginia before making several trips to Paris in the 1930s. He studied music with Aaron Copland, and in New York wrote music for theatrical productions, as well as other compositions. He achieved critical and popular success with his first novel The Sheltering Sky (1949), set in French North Africa, which he had visited in 1931.

In 1947, Bowles settled in Tangier, at that time in the Tangier International Zone, and his wife Jane Bowles followed in 1948. Except for winters spent in Ceylon during the early 1950s, Tangier was Bowles's home for the remainder of his life. He came to symbolize American immigrants in the city.

Bowles died in 1999 at the age of 88. His ashes are buried near family graves in Lakemont Cemetery, in upstate New York.

Life

1910–1930: Family and education
Paul Bowles was born in Jamaica, Queens, New York City, as the only child of Rena (née Winnewisser) and Claude Dietz Bowles, a dentist. His childhood was materially comfortable, but his father was a cold and domineering parent, opposed to any form of play or entertainment, and feared by both his son and wife. According to family legend, Claude had tried to kill his newborn son by leaving him exposed on a window-ledge during a snowstorm. The story may not be true, but Bowles believed it was and that it encapsulated his relationship with his father. Warmth in his childhood was provided by his mother, who read Nathaniel Hawthorne and Edgar Allan Poe to him – it was to the latter that he later attributed his own desire to write stories, such as "The Delicate Prey", "A Distant Episode", and "Pages from Cold Point".

Bowles could read at age 3 and was writing stories by age 4. Soon, he wrote surrealistic poetry and music. In 1922, at age 11, he bought his first book of poetry, Arthur Waley's A Hundred and Seventy Chinese Poems. At age 17, he had a poem, "Spire Song", accepted for publication in the literary journal transition. This Paris-based publication served as a forum for leading proponents of modernism – Djuna Barnes, James Joyce, Paul Éluard, Gertrude Stein and others. Bowles's interest in music also dated from his childhood, when his father bought a phonograph and classical records. (Bowles was interested in jazz, but such records were forbidden by his father.) His family bought a piano, and the young Bowles studied musical theory, singing, and piano. When he was 15, he attended a performance of Stravinsky's The Firebird at Carnegie Hall, which made a profound impression: "Hearing The Firebird made me determined to continue improvising on the piano when my father was out of the house, and to notate my own music with an increasing degree of knowing that I had happened upon a new and exciting mode of expression."

Bowles entered the University of Virginia in 1928, where his interests included T. S. Eliot's The Waste Land, Prokofiev, Duke Ellington, Gregorian chant, and blues. He also heard music by George Antheil and Henry Cowell. In April 1929, he dropped out without informing his parents, and sailed with a one-way ticket for Paris and no intention of returning – not, he said later, running away, but "running toward something, although I didn't know what at the time." Bowles spent the next months working for the Paris Herald Tribune and developing a friendship with Tristan Tzara. By July, he returned to New York and worked at Duttons Bookshop in Manhattan, where he began work on an unfinished book of fiction, Without Stopping (not to be confused with his later autobiography of the same title).

At the insistence of his parents, Bowles returned to studies at the University of Virginia but left after one semester to return to Paris with Aaron Copland, with whom he had been studying composition in New York. Copland was a lover as well as mentor to Bowles, who would later state that he was "other than Jane the most important person in my life": when their affair concluded, they remained friends for life.

It was during the autumn of 1930 in Paris that Bowles began work on his own first musical composition, the Sonata for Oboe and Clarinet, which he finished the following year. It premiered in New York at the Aeolian Hall on Wigmore Street, 16 December 1931. The entire concert (which also included work by Copland and Virgil Thomson) was panned by New York critics. (Bowles's first-known composition was completed earlier in Berlin: an adaptation as piano music of some vocal pieces by Kurt Schwitters.)

1931–1946: France and New York
In Paris, Bowles became a part of Gertrude Stein's literary and artistic circle. On her advice, he made his first visit to Tangier with Aaron Copland in the summer of 1931. They took a house on the mountain above Tangier Bay. Bowles later made Morocco his full-time home, and it inspired many of his short stories. From Tangier he returned to Berlin, where he met British writers Stephen Spender and Christopher Isherwood. (Isherwood was reportedly so taken with him that he named a character Sally Bowles in his novel after him.) The next year, Bowles returned to North Africa, traveling throughout other parts of Morocco, the Sahara, Algeria, and Tunisia.

In 1937, Bowles returned to New York. Over the next decade, he established a solid reputation as a composer, collaborating with Orson Welles, Tennessee Williams, and others on music for stage productions, as well as orchestral pieces.

In 1938, he married Jane Auer, an author and playwright. It was an unconventional marriage; their intimate relationships were reportedly with people of their own sex, but the couple maintained close personal ties with each other. During this time the couple joined the Communist Party of USA but soon left the organization after Bowles was ejected from the party.

Bowles has frequently been featured in anthologies as a gay writer, although he regarded such categories as both absurd and irrelevant. After a brief sojourn in France, the couple were prominent among the literary figures of New York throughout the 1940s. They briefly lived in February House in late 1939, using burlesque dancer Gypsy Rose Lee's room while she was performing in Chicago, but clashed with Benjamin Britten over use of the piano for composing, and other housemates over their noisy bedroom fantasies. Bowles also worked under Virgil Thomson as a music critic at the New York Herald Tribune. His zarzuela, The Wind Remains, based on a poem by Federico García Lorca, was performed in 1943 with choreography by Merce Cunningham and conducted by Leonard Bernstein. His translation of Jean-Paul Sartre's play Huis Clos (No Exit), directed by John Huston, won a Drama Critic's Award in 1943.

In 1945, Bowles began writing prose again, beginning with a few short stories including "A Distant Episode". His wife Jane, he said, was the main influence upon his taking up fiction as an adult, when she published her first novel Two Serious Ladies (1943).

1947–1956: Early years in Tangier
In 1947, Bowles received a contract for a novel from Doubleday; with the advance, he moved permanently to Tangier. Jane joined him there the following year. Bowles commented:

Bowles traveled alone into the Algerian Sahara to work on the novel. He later said, "I wrote in bed in hotels in the desert." He drew inspiration from personal experience, noting years later that, "Whatever one writes is in a sense autobiographical, of course. Not factually so, but poetically so." He titled the novel The Sheltering Sky, from a song, "Down Among the Sheltering Palms", which he had heard every summer as a child. It was first published by John Lehmann Limited in England, in September 1949, after Doubleday rejected the manuscript.

Bowles recalled:
I sent it out to Doubleday and they refused it. They said, "We asked for a novel." They didn't consider it a novel. I had to give back my advance. My agent told me later they called the editor on the carpet for having refused the book – only after they saw that it was selling fast. It only had to do with sales. They didn't bother to read it.

A first American edition, by New Directions Publishing, appeared the following month. The plot follows three Americans: Port, his wife Kit, and their friend, Tunner, as they journey through the Algerian desert. The reviewer for TIME magazine commented that the ends visited upon the two main characters "seem appropriate but by no means tragic", but that "Bowles scores cleanly with his minor characters: Arab pimps and prostitutes, French officers in garrison towns, [and] a stupidly tiresome pair of tourists—mother & son." In The New York Times, playwright and critic Tennessee Williams commented that the book was like a summer thunderstorm, "pulsing with interior flashes of fire". The book quickly rose to the New York Times best-seller list, going through three printings in two months.

In 1950, Bowles published his first collection of short stories. Titled A Little Stone (John Lehmann, London, August 1950), it omitted two of Bowles's most famous short stories, "Pages From Cold Point" and "The Delicate Prey". British critic Cyril Connolly and writer Somerset Maugham had advised him that if they were included in the collection, distribution and/or censorship difficulties might ensue. The American edition by Random House, The Delicate Prey and Other Stories (November 1950), did include these two stories.

In an interview 30 years later, Bowles responded to an observation that almost all of the characters in "The Delicate Prey" were victimized by either physical or psychological violence. He said:
Yes, I suppose. The violence served a therapeutic purpose. It's unsettling to think that at any moment life can flare up into senseless violence. But it can and does, and people need to be ready for it. What you make for others is first of all what you make for yourself. If I'm persuaded that our life is predicated upon violence, that the entire structure of what we call civilization, the scaffolding that we've built up over the millennia, can collapse at any moment, then whatever I write is going to be affected by that assumption. The process of life presupposes violence, in the plant world the same as the animal world. But among the animals only man can conceptualize violence. Only man can enjoy the idea of destruction.

He set his second novel, Let It Come Down (John Lehmann, London, February 1952), in North Africa, specifically Tangier. It explored the disintegration of an American (Nelson Dyar) who was unprepared for the encounter with an alien culture. The first American edition by Random House was published later that same month.

Bowles set his third novel, The Spider's House (Random House, New York, November 1955), in Fez, immediately prior to Morocco's gaining independence and sovereignty in 1956. In it, he charted the relationships among three immigrants and a young Moroccan: John Stenham, Alain Moss, Lee Veyron, and Amar. Reviewers noted that the novel marked a departure from Bowles's earlier fiction in that it introduced a contemporary political theme, the conflict between Moroccan nationalism and French colonialism. The UK edition (Macdonald) was published in January 1957.

While Bowles was concentrating on his career as a writer, he composed incidental music for nine plays presented by the American School of Tangier. The Bowles couple became fixtures of the American and European immigrant scene in Tangier. Visitors included Truman Capote, Tennessee Williams and Gore Vidal. William S. Burroughs, and the Beat writers Allen Ginsberg and Gregory Corso followed in the mid-1950s and early 1960s. In 1951, Bowles was introduced to the Master Musicians of Jajouka, having first heard the musicians when he and Brion Gysin attended a festival, or moussem, at Sidi Kacem. Bowles described his continued association with the Master Musicians of Jajouka and their hereditary leader Bachir Attar in his book, Days: A Tangier Journal.

In 1952, Bowles bought the tiny island of Taprobane, off the coast of Ceylon. There, he wrote much of his novel The Spider's House and returned to Tangier in the warmer months. He stayed in Sri Lanka most winters.

1957–1973: Moroccan music and translation
In 1957, Jane Bowles suffered a mild stroke, which marked the beginning of a long and painful decline in her health. Her condition preoccupied Paul Bowles until Jane's death in 1973.

During the late 1950s, Morocco achieved independence. With a grant from the Rockefeller Foundation and sponsorship from the US Library of Congress, Bowles spent the months of August to September 1959 traveling throughout Morocco with Christopher Wanklyn and Mohammed Larbi, recording traditional Moroccan music. From 1959 to 1961, Bowles recorded a wide variety of music from the different ethnic groups in Morocco, including the Sephardic Jewish communities of Meknes and Essaouira.

During these years, Bowles also worked at translating Moroccan authors and story-tellers, including Mohamed Choukri, Ahmed Yacoubi, Larbi Layachi (under the pseudonym Driss ben Hamed Charhadi), and Mohammed Mrabet.

In the autumn of 1968, invited by friend Oliver Evans, Bowles was a visiting scholar for one semester at the English Department of the San Fernando Valley State College, (now California State University, Northridge). He taught "Advanced Narrative Writing and the Modern European Novel."

In 1970, Bowles and Daniel Halpern founded the literary magazine Antaeus, based in Tangier. It featured many new, as well as established authors. Bowles's work was also represented, including his story "Afternoon with Antaeus."

1974–1995: Later years
After his wife's death, on 4 May 1973 in Málaga, Spain, Bowles continued to live in Tangier. He wrote regularly and received many visitors to his modest apartment.

In the summers of 1980 and 1982, Bowles conducted writing workshops in Morocco, at the American School of Tangier (under the auspices of the School of Visual Arts in New York). These were considered successful. Among several students who have become successful authors are Rodrigo Rey Rosa, the 2004 Winner of the Miguel Ángel Asturias National Prize in Literature, and Mark Terrill. Bowles designated Rey Rosa as the literary heir of his and Jane Bowles's estates.

In 1982, Bowles published Points in Time, subtitled Tales From Morocco, a collection of stories. Divided into eleven parts, the work consists of untitled story fragments, anecdotes, and travel narratives. These stories are not included in either The Stories of Paul Bowles (Ecco Press) or Collected Stories and Later Writings (The Library of America).

In 1985, Bowles published his translation of Jorge Luis Borges's short story, "The Circular Ruins". It was collected in a book of 16 stories, all translated by Bowles, called She Woke Me Up So I Killed Her. This Borges story had previously been published in translations by the three main Borges translators: Anthony Kerrigan, Anthony Bonner, and James E. Irby.

In 1988, when Bowles was asked in an interview about his social life, he replied, "I don't know what a social life is ... My social life is restricted to those who serve me and give me meals, and those who want to interview me." When asked in the same interview how he would summarize his achievement, he said, "I've written some books and some music. That's what I've achieved."

Bowles had a cameo appearance at the beginning and end of the film version of The Sheltering Sky (1990), directed by Bernardo Bertolucci. Bowles's music was overlooked and mostly forgotten for more than a generation, but in the 1990s, a new generation of American musicians and singers became interested in his work again. Art song enthusiasts savor what are described as "charming, witty pieces."
In 1994, Bowles was visited and interviewed by writer Paul Theroux, who featured him in his last chapter of his travel book, The Pillars of Hercules.

1995–1999 : Final years
In 1995, Bowles made his final return to New York, invited to a "Paul Bowles Festival" at Lincoln Center celebrating his music. The music was performed by Jonathan Sheffer leading the Eos Orchestra. A related symposium on Bowles's work and interview were held at the New School for Social Research. A Canadian documentary on his life, Let It Come Down: The Life of Paul Bowles won Best Documentary at the 27th Annual International Emmy Awards in New York City.

Visitors in 1998 reported that Bowles's wit and intellect endured. He continued to welcome visitors to his apartment in Tangier but, on the advice of doctors and friends, limited interviews. One of the last was an interview with Stephen Morison, Jr., a friend teaching at the American School of Tangier. It was featured in the July/August 1999 issue of Poets & Writers magazine. On June 6, 1999, Irene Herrmann, the executrix of the Paul Bowles Music Estate, interviewed him to focus on his musical career; this was published in September 2003.

Bowles died of heart failure on November 18, 1999, at the Italian Hospital in Tangier, aged 88. He had been ill for some time with respiratory problems. His ashes were buried in Lakemont, New York, next to the graves of his parents and grandparents.

Bowles and Tangier

Paul Bowles lived for 52 of his 88 years in Tangier. He became strongly identified with the city and symbolized American immigrants. Obituary writers typically linked his life to his residency there.

When Bowles had first visited Tangier with Aaron Copland in 1931, they were both outsiders to what they perceived as an exotic place of unfamiliar customs. They were not bound by any local rules, which varied among the many ethnic groups. Tangier was a Moroccan and international city, a longtime trading center, with a population made up of Berber, Arab, Spanish, French and other Europeans, speaking Spanish, French, Berber and Arabic, and professing a variety of religions. Politically it was under the control of a consortium of foreign powers, including the United States. Bowles was entranced by the city's culture.

By his return in 1947 the city somewhat changed, but he still found it intriguing. In 1955, anti-European riots erupted as Moroccans sought independence. In 1956, the city was returned to full Moroccan control.

Music

Introduction
Paul Bowles first studied music with Aaron Copland. In the fall of 1931, following an introduction from Copland, he entered the studio of Virgil Thomson.
 
Bowles had thought of himself first as a poet, having published some verse in his brief time at the University of Virginia in the pages of transition. Unfortunately, the quality of his poetry eluded any of the intellectuals he would later encounter in Paris. Among them was Gertrude Stein, from whom he received the sobriquet, "the manufactured savage," and who begged him to give up writing poetry.

However, his music of the time, demonstrated by a propensity for Ravel-like piano improvisations, charmed both Copland and Thomson, alike. In his book, Copland On Music (Doubleday & Company, New York, 1960), Copland remarked:

For Copland the allure of Bowles's music would never diminish. In later years he was recorded as having said, "Paul Bowles' music is always fresh; I've never known him to write a dull piece."

However, the precocity of Bowles's early musical efforts would later belie a lack of professional training and discipline. Copland had tried in New York to teach him harmony, but had found him to be a stubborn pupil. In Paris Bowles approached Nadia Boulanger for lessons, and Thomson recommended him to Paul Dukas. In the end, he would work with neither.

Development
Apart from irregular consultation with Vittorio Rieti, Bowles never received any formal instruction in music, despite the best efforts of Aaron Copland and Virgil Thomson to persuade him otherwise. However, the self-taught composer, with assistance from Thomson, found success in New York as a producer of incidental music for the theatre. He collaborated with the likes of George Balanchine, Joseph Losey, Leonard Bernstein, Elia Kazan, Arthur Koestler, José Ferrer, Salvador Dalí, Orson Welles, William Saroyan and Tennessee Williams.

During the Second World War he turned his hand to writing as a reviewer for the New York Herald Tribune, where Thomson then served as music critic. Bowles was well-suited to the work, according to Thomson, "because he wrote clearly and because he had the gift of judgment."

Following Virgil Thomson's retirement from his critic's post in 1954, reminiscing on his wish Paul Bowles had taken over the position, Bowles remarked, "I don't think I could have handled it, any more than I could have followed a career in composition. I lacked the musical training that [Virgil] and Aaron had."

A new direction
After the war, eventually settling in Tangier, Morocco, Bowles continued his musical and literary pursuits, gradually letting go of the former and becoming what Virgil Thomson described as, "a novelist and story writer of international repute."

Paul Bowles referred to Tangier as "a place where it is still hard to find a piano in tune." Regarding his establishment as an author in Morocco, Bowles said:

Little by little I was aware of there being atmospheres which I could only portray by writing about them. I was unable to express my emotions in their entirety through music. My music was joyful as I was myself. The more nocturnal side to my personality, I managed to express through language.

With the success of the book, The Sheltering Sky, Bowles struck his first blow for independence. In time this break from the composition of music would see Bowles's earlier exploits overshadowed completely by his acclaim as a writer of prose.

Recapitulation
Only in the decade before his death was there a renewed interest in his musical output from the 1930s and '40s. This movement may have culminated in May 1994, at the Théâtre du Rond-Point in Paris, with the presentation of a live concert performance, and at which the then 83-year-old Paul Bowles was in attendance. The program included a number of Bowles's original songs and pieces for piano, plus musical tributes and portraits of the composer by Virgil Thomson, Leonard Bernstein, and Phillip Ramey. At least as regards the past neglect of his own catalogue, this ongoing revival may serve as proof of Bowles's own words: "Music only exists when it is played."

Renewal of respect for Paul Bowles's music has led to several commercial recording projects. In 2016 the Invencia Piano Duo (Andrey Kasparov and Oksana Lutsyshyn), in collaboration with Naxos Records and its American Classics division, released two CDs of Bowles's complete piano works.

Volume one opens with pieces inspired by Latin American themes, evocative of the composer's interest in the culture and his fluency in the Spanish language. The second of the two volumes closes with arrangements of Blue Mountain Ballads (1946), set for piano duet by Dr. Andrey Kasparov, and three miscellaneous pieces, set for two pianos by the American piano duo of Arthur Gold and Robert Fizdale. The latter three arrangements were uncovered in the Gold and Fizdale Collection, held in the Peter Jay Sharp Special Collections, Lila Acheson Wallace Library, The Juilliard School. Dr. Kasparov reconstructed the original manuscripts which permitted these duets to be recorded for the very first time.

Recording of Moroccan music
Paul Bowles was a pioneer in the field of North African ethnomusicology, making field recordings from 1959 to 1961 of traditional Moroccan music for the US Library of Congress. The collection includes dance music, secular music, music for Ramadan and other celebrations, and music for animistic rituals. Bowles realised that modern culture would inevitably change and influence the practice of traditional music, and he wanted to preserve some of it.

Bowles commented on the political aspects of the practice of traditional music:

Instrumentalists and singers have come into being in lieu of chroniclers and poets, and even during the most recent chapter in the country's evolution – the war for independence and the setting up of the present regime – each phase of the struggle has been celebrated in song.

The total collection of this recorded music is known as The Paul Bowles Collection; it is archived in the US Library of Congress, Reference No. 72-750123. The Archival Manuscript Material (Collection) contains 97 x 2-track 7" reel-to-reel tapes, containing approximately sixty hours of traditional folk, art and popular music, one box of manuscripts, 18 photographs, and a map, along with the 2-LP recording called Music of Morocco (AFS L63-64).

Translating other authors
In the 1960s Bowles began translating and collecting stories from the oral tradition of native Moroccan storytellers. His most noteworthy collaborators included Mohammed Mrabet, Driss Ben Hamed Charhadi (Larbi Layachi), Mohamed Choukri, Abdeslam Boulaich, and Ahmed Yacoubi.

He also translated writers whose original work was written in Spanish, Portuguese and French: Rodrigo Rey Rosa, Jorge Luis Borges, Jean-Paul Sartre, Isabelle Eberhardt, Roger Frison-Roche, André Pieyre de Mandiargues, Ramón Gómez de la Serna, Giorgio de Chirico, Si Lakhdar, E. Laoust, Ramon Beteta, Gabino Chan, Bertrand Flornoy, Jean Ferry, Denise Moran, Paul Colinet, Paul Magritte, Popul Buj, Francis Ponge, Bluet d'Acheres and Ramon Sender.

Achievement and legacy
Paul Bowles is considered one of the artists to have shaped 20th-century literature and music. In his "Introduction" to Bowles's Collected Stories (1979) Gore Vidal ranked the short stories as "among the best ever written by an American", writing: "the floor to this ramshackle civilization that we have built cannot bear much longer our weight. It was Bowles's genius to suggest the horrors which lie beneath that floor, as fragile, in its way, as the sky that shelters us from a devouring vastness".

Critics have described his music, in contrast, "as full of light as the fiction [is] of dark ... almost as if the composer were a totally different person from the writer." During the early 1930s, Bowles studied composition (intermittently) with Aaron Copland; his music from this period "is reminiscent of Satie and Poulenc." Returning to New York in the mid-30s, Bowles became one of the preeminent composers of American theater music, producing works for William Saroyan, Tennessee Williams, and others, "show[ing] exceptional skill and imagination in capturing the mood, emotion, and ambience of each play to which he was assigned." Bowles said that such incidental music allowed him to present "climaxless music, hypnotic music in one of the exact senses of the word, in that it makes its effect without the spectator being made aware of it." At the same time he continued to write concert music, assimilating some of the melodic, rhythmic, and other stylistic elements of African, Mexican, and Central American music.

In 1991, Bowles was awarded the annual Rea Award for the Short Story. The jury gave the following citation: "Paul Bowles is a storyteller of the utmost purity and integrity. He writes of a world before God became man; a world in which men and women in extremis are seen as components in a larger, more elemental drama. His prose is crystalline and his voice unique. Among living American masters of the short story, Paul Bowles is sui generis."

The historic building of the American Legation in Tangier includes an entire wing devoted to Paul Bowles. In 2010, they received a donation of furniture, photographs and documents compiled by Gloria Kirby, a permanent resident of Tanger and friend of Bowles.

The Library of America published an edition of Bowles's works in 2002.

Works
In addition to his chamber and stage compositions, Bowles published fourteen short story collections, several novels, three volumes of poetry, numerous translations, numerous travel articles, and an autobiography.

Music

Fiction

Novels

Short fiction

Short stories (collections)

Poetry

Translations

Travel, autobiography and letters

Editions

Selected discography of musical compositions and readings

Film appearances and interviews

References

Further reading

Biographies and memoirs
Paul Bowles: 2117 Tanger Socco, Robert Briatte (1989),  The first biography of Paul Bowles (in French)
An Invisible Spectator: A Biography of Paul Bowles, Christopher Sawyer-Laucanno (1989)
You Are Not I: A Portrait of Paul Bowles, Millicent Dillon (1998)
Paul Bowles: A Life, Virginia Spencer Carr (2004), 
Isherwood, Bowles, Vedanta, Wicca, and Me, Lee Prosser (2001), 
Paul Bowles, Magic and Morocco, Allan Hibbard (2004), 
February House, Sherill Tippins (2005), 
Paul Bowles by his Friends, Gary Pulsifer (1992), 
Second Son: an autobiography, David Herbert (1972), 
The Sheltering Sky, (movie edition) Bertolucci and Bowles (1990), 
Here to Learn, Mark Terrill (2002), 
Yesterday's Perfume, Cherie Nutting with Paul Bowles (2000), 
"Tangier Love Story, Jane Bowles, Paul Bowles and Me", Carol Adman (2014), ASIN B00NMM642G

Literary criticism of Paul Bowles
The Short Story in Midcentury America: Countercultural Form in the Work of Bowles, McCarthy, Welty, and Williams, Sam Reese (2017), 
Paul Bowles: Romantic Savage, Gena Dagel Caponi (1994), 
Paul Bowles: The Inner Geography, Wayne Pounds (1985), 
Paul Bowles: The Illumination of North Africa, Lawrence D. Stewart (1974), 
Paul Bowles: Twayne's Authors Series, Gena Dagel Caponi (1998), 
The Fiction of Paul Bowles: The Soul is the Weariest Part of the Body, Hans Bertens (1979),

Published interviews with Bowles
Conversations with Paul Bowles, Gena Dagel Caponi (1993), 
Desultory Correspondence, Florian Vetsch (1997),

Catalog and archive editions on Bowles
Paul Bowles: A Descriptive Bibliography, Jeffrey Miller (1986), 
Paul Bowles on Music, edited by Timothy Mangan and Irene Herrmann (2003),

Other references

External links

Archives 
Paul Bowles papers, Special Collections, University of Delaware Library
Paul Bowles collection, Special Collections, University of Delaware Library
Virginia Spencer Carr papers, Special Collections, University of Delaware Library
Paul Bowles collection at the Harry Ransom Center, University of Texas at Austin
Paul Bowles papers at Rare Book & Manuscript Library, Columbia University Libraries

Exhibitions 

 Paul Bowles at 80 (online exhibition), Special Collections, University of Delaware Library
 Paul Bowles, 1910-1990 (online exhibition), Special Collections, University of Delaware Library

Other links 
"The Authorized Paul Bowles Web Site"
 Paul Bowles audio and music web published on the Tellus Audio Cassette Magazine project archive at Ubuweb
 Music of Morocco: The Paul Bowles Recordings for the American Folklife Collection at archnet.org

Interviews
More interviews on the official Paul Bowles website
 
 
 Clips of interviews with Bowles from the documentary Paul Bowles in Morocco
 "Paul Bowles, A Conversation with Bruce Duffie" (Bruce Duffie, May 1992)
 
 "Stranger on a Strange Shore" (Gaither Stewart, Critique magazine, October 2000).

Assessments
Paul Bowles' Tangier and Fez, Mohamed Elkouche (from “Paul Bowles' Tangier and Fez: The Agony of Transition from Colonial to Post-colonial Times,” in Urban Generations: Post-Colonial Cities, Mohamed V University, Rabat, 2005.

Reviews and obituaries
 Review of "The Sheltering Sky", Time, December 5, 1945
 Review of "The Spider's House", New York Times, 1955
 Review of "Up Above the World", The New York Times, 1966
 Obituary, Manchester Guardian, 19 November 1999
 Obituary, BBC World, 19 November 1999

1910 births
1999 deaths
20th-century American composers
20th-century American male musicians
20th-century American male writers
20th-century American memoirists
20th-century American novelists
20th-century classical composers
20th-century translators
American agnostics
American classical composers
American ethnomusicologists
American expatriates in France
American expatriates in Morocco
American male classical composers
American male non-fiction writers
American male novelists
American male short story writers
American opera composers
American short story writers
American translators
Beat Generation writers
Bisexual men
Bisexual musicians
American bisexual writers
California State University faculty
Existentialists
French–English translators
Male opera composers
Members of the American Academy of Arts and Letters
Members of the Communist Party USA
Musicians from Queens, New York
Novelists from New York (state)
People from Jamaica, Queens
People from Tangier
School of Visual Arts faculty
University of Virginia alumni
Writers from Queens, New York